This article includes the world record progression for the 4×100 metres freestyle relay, and it shows the chronological history of world record times in that competitive swimming event.  The 4×100 metres freestyle relay is a relay event in which each of four swimmers on a team swims a 100-metre freestyle leg in sequence.  The world records are recognized by and maintained by FINA, the international competitive swimming and aquatics federation that overseas the sport in international competition.

World records in swimming were first recognized by FINA in 1908.  The long course (50-metre pool) world records are historically older than the short course (25-metre pool) records.  FINA amended its regulations governing the recognition of world records in 1956; specifically, FINA mandated that only record times that were contested in 50-metre (or 55-yard) pools were eligible for recognition after that time.  The short-course world records have been separately recognized since 1991. On July 25, 2013 FINA Technical Swimming Congress voted to allow world records in the long course mixed 400 free relay and mixed 400 medley relay, as well as in six events in short course meters: the mixed 200 medley and 200 free relays, as well as the men's and women's 200 free relays and the men's and women's 200 medley relays. In October 2013 FINA decided to establish "standards" before something can be recognized as the first world record in these events. But later on March 13, 2014 FINA has officially ratified the eight world records set by Indiana University swimmers at the IU Relay Rally held on September 26, 2013 in Bloomington.

The women's 4×100-metre event was first contested at the 1912 Summer Olympics in Stockholm, but the men's 4×100-metre event did not appear until the 1964 Summer Olympics in Tokyo.  Prior to 1964, the longer 4×200-metre freestyle relay was the only men's relay event staged.

The men's 4×100-metre freestyle is often considered "swimming’s indisputably best event at the Olympics", as "It is also the Alpha Dog moment in water. Our Country is faster than Your Country". Nathan Adrian was quoted as saying “Every American swimmer dreams of getting up there in the 4x100 free relay and winning a gold medal.” The Australians won the event at the 2000 Summer Olympics which they hosted and celebrated by playing air guitar, while the Australian relay team was dubbed "Weapons of Mass Destruction" after winning in the 2011 World Aquatics Championships. At the 2008 Summer Olympics, ; while the French team did beat the previous world record, they did it 0:00.08 after Jason Lezak had already edged out Bernard in the anchor leg, giving the Americans the gold and a new world record, which is still standing today.

Men

Men's long course

Men's short course

Women

Women's long course

Women's short course

Mixed 

FINA recognizes only long-course world records for mixed relays in this event.

All-time top 10 by country

Men long course
Correct as of June 2022

Men short course
Correct as of December 2022

Women long course
Correct as of October 2021

Women short course
Correct as of December 2022

Mixed long course
Correct as of 24 June 2022

All-time top 25

Men long course
Correct as of August 2022

Men short course
Correct as of December 2022

Women long course
Correct as of 24 June 2022

Women short course
Correct as of December 2022

Mixed long course
Correct as of 10 August 2022

Mixed short course
Correct as of December 2021

References

External links 
 Men's Event (long course) world progression at www.olympic.org
 Women's Event (long course) world progression at www.olympic.org

Freestyle relay 4x100 metres
4 × 100 metre freestyle relay